DSR may refer to:

Science and technology
 Dynamic shear rheometer, used for research and development as well as for quality control in the manufacture of a wide range of materials
 Doubly special relativity, a proposed modification of Einstein's special relativity theory
 Dynamic steering response, a car safety technology
 Design science research, a set of analytical techniques and perspectives for performing IS research

Computing
 Data Set Ready, an RS-232 signal used by a modem to indicate to the computer that it is ready to receive data
 Dynamic Source Routing protocol, an on-demand routing protocol for ad hoc networks
 Dynamic Super Resolution, a feature of Nvidia's Fermi and newer series of graphics cards
 Device Status Report (ANSI), an ANSI X3.64 escape sequence
 Data signaling rate, in telecommunication
 Direct Server Return, in telecommunication

Organizations
 Dansk Sygeplejeråd, The Danish Nurses' Organization
 Digital Systems Resources, a private defense contractor acquired by General Dynamics in 2003
 Donor Sibling Registry, a US organization serving donors
 Deputy Superintendent Rangers, a Pakistan Rangers Gazetted officer rank equivalent to the Captain rank of Armed forces

Sports
 Daily Scratch Rating, a component of the Golf Australia Handicap System
 Don Schumacher Racing, NHRA Top Fuel drag racing team of Tony Schumacher and other drivers
 Detroit Sports Report, a sports highlight show broadcast on FSN Detroit

Other uses
 Dark Souls: Remastered, a remaster of the 2011 action role-playing game Dark Souls
 Demand-side response, a form of energy system demand management
 Data structure report, an archaeological report, which is the initial report written for an archaeological site in Scotland
 Designed sanitary relief, a civil engineering structure designed to relieve wet weather flows from municipal sanitary systems
 Digital Stream/Satellite Rip, in pirated movie release types
 Consumer Protection (Distance Selling) Regulations 2000 or Distance Selling Regulations
 Detailed Seller Ratings, a rating system employed by eBay that allows buyers to anonymously rate sellers in four categories while leaving feedback
 Dating, Sex and Relationships - used by manosphere